Geometry of quantum systems (e.g.,
noncommutative geometry and supergeometry) is mainly
phrased in algebraic terms of modules and
algebras. Connections on modules are
generalization of a linear connection on a smooth vector bundle  written as a Koszul connection on the

Commutative algebra 

Let  be a commutative ring
and  an A-module. There are different equivalent definitions

First definition

If  is a ring homomorphism, a -linear connection is a -linear morphism
 
which satisfies the identity
 
A connection extends, for all  to a unique map

  

satisfying . A connection is said to be integrable if , or equivalently, if the curvature  vanishes.

Second definition

Let  be the module of derivations of a ring . A
connection on an A-module  is defined
as an A-module morphism

 

such that the first order differential operators  on
 obey the Leibniz rule

 

Connections on a module over a commutative ring always exist.

The curvature of the connection  is defined as
the zero-order differential operator

 

on the module  for all .

If  is a vector bundle, there is one-to-one
correspondence between linear
connections  on the
Strictly speaking,  corresponds to
the covariant differential of a

Graded commutative algebra 

The notion of a connection on modules over commutative rings is
straightforwardly extended to modules over a graded
commutative algebra. This is the case of
superconnections in supergeometry of
graded manifolds and supervector bundles.
Superconnections always exist.

Noncommutative algebra 

If  is a noncommutative ring, connections on left
and right A-modules are defined similarly to those on
modules over commutative rings. However
these connections need not exist.

In contrast with connections on left and right modules, there is a
problem how to define a connection on an
R-S-bimodule over noncommutative rings
R and S. There are different definitions
of such a connection. Let us mention one of them. A connection on an
R-S-bimodule  is defined as a bimodule
morphism

 

which obeys the Leibniz rule

See also 

Connection (vector bundle) 
Connection (mathematics)
Noncommutative geometry
Supergeometry 
Differential calculus over commutative algebras

Notes

References 

 Koszul, J., Homologie et cohomologie des algebres de Lie,Bulletin de la Société Mathématique 78 (1950) 65
 Koszul, J., Lectures on Fibre Bundles and Differential Geometry (Tata University, Bombay, 1960)
 Bartocci, C., Bruzzo, U., Hernandez Ruiperez, D., The Geometry of Supermanifolds (Kluwer Academic Publ., 1991) 
 Dubois-Violette, M., Michor, P., Connections on central bimodules in noncommutative differential geometry, J. Geom. Phys. 20 (1996) 218. 
 Landi, G., An Introduction to Noncommutative Spaces and their Geometries, Lect. Notes Physics, New series m: Monographs, 51 (Springer, 1997) , iv+181 pages.
 Mangiarotti, L., Sardanashvily, G., Connections in Classical and Quantum Field Theory (World Scientific, 2000)

External links 
 Sardanashvily, G., Lectures on Differential Geometry of Modules and Rings (Lambert Academic Publishing, Saarbrücken, 2012); 

Connection (mathematics)
Noncommutative geometry